VFCC may refer to:

Valley Forge Christian College, former name of the University of Valley Forge, an American four-year residential university in Phoenixville, Pennsylvania, near Valley Forge National Historical Park
Valley Forge Convention Center, site of the Valley Forge Casino Resort, a casino near King of Prussia, Pennsylvania, which opened in 2012
an event complex in King of Prussia, Pennsylvania
Vancouver Film Critics Circle, an association of media professionals in Vancouver, British Columbia